The 1991–92 Meistriliiga season was the second season of the Meistriliiga, the top level of ice hockey in Estonia. Nine teams participated in the league, and Kreenholm Narva won the championship.

First round

Final round

External links
Season on hockeyarchives.info

Meistriliiga
Meist
1992 in Estonian sport
Meistriliiga (ice hockey) seasons